Grand Ayatollah Sayyid Muhammad-Saeed al-Tabataba'i al-Hakim (February 1, 1936 – September 3, 2021) was an Iraqi senior Shi'a marja, one of the Big Four Grand Ayatollahs of the Hawza of  Najaf and one of the most senior Shia clerics in Iraq after Ayatollah Ali al-Sistani.

Biography

Birth
Grand Ayatollah Saeed al Hakim was born in the holy city of Najaf on 1 February 1936.

Family
Sayyid Muhammad Saeed Al-Hakim was a member of the well known and highly respected Hakim Family of Shiite scholars. He was the son of Ayatollah Muhammad Ali al-Hakim, grandson of Sayyid Ahmad al-Hakim, and grand nephew of Grand Ayatollah Sayyid Muhsin al-Hakim. His second cousin, Sayyed Ammar al-Hakim led the Islamic Supreme Council of Iraq, one of the largest Shia political parties in Iraq.

Education
He started his earlier education at the age of 5. His great father, Ayatollah Mohamed Ali al-Hakim started teaching him from the introductory subjects like Arabic language, grammar, logic, eloquence, jurisprudence and its fundamentals till he finished most of his intermediate studies. Further he also studied from his grandfather Grand Ayatollah Sayyid Mohsin al-hakeem where he attended a great deal of his Jurisprudence teachings. Ayatollah Hussein Al-Hilli and Sayyid Abu al Qasim al Khoei were also among his teachers.

Residence 
Ayatollah Saeed al Hakim resided in Najaf, Iraq and taught many of the students in Hawza of Najaf.

Death 
Ayatollah Saeed al Hakim died on 3 September 2021 aged 85 from a heart attack.

Assassination attempt
In 2003, he was targeted in an attempted assassination, when his house in Najaf was bombed. Three people were killed but al-Hakim suffered only minor injuries. He had previously been threatened that he would be killed if he didn't leave Najaf. Originally the Sunni fundamentalist Jama'at al-Tawhid wal-Jihad (who later became al-Qaeda in Iraq) was blamed. However, the bombing has also been attributed to followers of rival Shia cleric Muqtada al-Sadr.

Amman Message
Al-Hakim was one of the Ulama signatories of the Amman Message, which gives a broad foundation for defining Muslim orthodoxy.

Works
He wrote many books, some of which have been translated into Persian, Urdu, and English.

 Almohkem in the fundamentals of the jurisprudence - it is a detailed full course in the fundamentals of the jurisprudence in six volumes.
 Misbahul minhag in the jurisprudence laws derivation - based in details on the book of Minhag al saliheen. So far he finished 15 volumes.
 Minhag al saliheen - his Risala - practical laws of his verdicts in three volumes.
 Menasik – Pilgrimage and Omra Rituals.
 A message to the people in the west
 A message to the religions promoters and the hawza students - translated into Persian and Urdu.
 A dialogue with his eminence about the religious authority
 Morshid al Moghtarib -  instructions and verdicts related to the people in the west.
 Fi rihab al aqeeda - detailed dialogue with a Jordanian personality in the issues of beliefs, in 3 volumes
 Religious laws of computer and internet - translated into English.
 Human cloning - Translated into English
 Religious dialogues
 A message to the devotees in Azerbaijan - translated into the Azeri language.
 A message to the pilgrims of the holy house of God

References

External links
 Official website

1936 births
2021 deaths
People from Najaf
Iraqi ayatollahs
Al-Hakim family
20th-century Islamic religious leaders
21st-century Islamic religious leaders